Askat is a rural locality (a selo) in Uznezinskoye Rural Settlement of Chemalsky District, the Altai Republic, Russia. The population was 227 as of 2016. There are 12 streets.

Geography 
Askat is located on the left bank of the Katun River, south from Gorno-Altaysk, 19 km north of Chemal (the district's administrative centre) by road. Turbaza "Katun" is the nearest rural locality.

References 

Rural localities in Chemalsky District